Arcturus COVID-19 vaccine may refer to:
ARCT-021 
ARCT-154